Puysegur Point is a headland located in the far southwest of the South Island of New Zealand.

The name 'Puysegur' was bestowed by Lieutenant Jules Dumont d'Urville or Midshipman Jules de Blosseville during a South Pacific expedition of La Coquille; probably in honour of the French naval officer Antoine-Hyacinthe-Anne de Chastenet de Puységur (1752–1809).

Puysegur Point has been said to be the windiest place in New Zealand, with gales recorded on an average of 48 days a year.

Humpback whales pass the point during annual migrations.

Lighthouse

A lighthouse on the point was first illuminated on 1 March 1879. The original wooden lighthouse was destroyed in an arson attack in 1942. The lighthouse was operated by permanent lighthouse keepers from its establishment in 1879 until it was temporarily shutdown in 1980, with a further period of manned operation from 1987 until it was fully automated and demanned in 1989.

The landing 

The main access to Puysegur Point and the lighthouse is via a track from a beach landing point at Otago Retreat - a narrow waterway between the mainland and Coal Island in Preservation Inlet. The name Otago Retreat originates from the passage of the schooner Otago that found shelter in this narrow passage during a voyage accompanying the survey ship HMS Acheron on a survey of the South Island around 1850-51. There are buildings remaining at the landing that formerly served the lighthouse. One of the buildings is a Department of Conservation shelter, known as the Landing Shed.

References

External links

Puysegur Point lighthouse at Maritime New Zealand

Lighthouses in New Zealand
Headlands of Southland, New Zealand
Landforms of Fiordland
Transport buildings and structures in Southland, New Zealand